A Collection of Metal is a compilation album by the British heavy metal band Saxon released in 1996 (see 1996 in music).

Track listing

References

1996 compilation albums
Saxon (band) compilation albums
EMI Records compilation albums